Robert Colling (1749 – 7 March 1820), and his brother Charles (1751 – 16 January 1836), were English stock breeders, famous for their improvement of the Shorthorn breed of cows.

Life

He was the eldest son of Charles Colling of Ketton, near Darlington, and brother of Charles Colling. After receiving "an ordinary education", he was apprenticed to a grocer in Shields; but "not having his health" he came home to his father's farm and commenced an agricultural career. After spending some time at Hurworth, he entered on a farm at Barmpton, under the Lambton family.  He had then "no thought of becoming a breeder of shorthorns, and only kept dairy cows".

The foundation of his pedigree herd was a yellow-red and white bull, originally bought on the advice of his brother Charles for eight guineas, and afterwards sold to his brother for the Ketton herd (known in shorthorn history as 'Hubback'). A "shyness" sprang up between the brothers, which became accentuated in March 1793; and the Barmpton and Ketton herds for some time lived apart, though later more amicable relations were restored. When, in October 1810, Charles Colling sold off his Ketton herd of shorthorns, Robert's herd at Barmpton 'became the centre of interest' to the breeders of shorthorns, which had then become fashionable.

"The same system of inbreeding that had been in vogue at Ketton was pursued without interruption at Barmpton, and that without any admixture of fresh alloy". Robert carried on his herd until Michaelmas day, 1810, when it was sold by auction, and sixty-one lots fetched £7,852 19s.

He died unmarried at Barmpton on 7 March 1820, leaving his property to his brother Charles, a final sale being held on 3 October 1820.

References

Attribution
 THE DURHAM OX (Robert & Charles Colling)

1749 births
1820 deaths
English farmers